The 2007 Hypo Group Tennis International was a men's tennis tournament that was part of the International Series of the 2007 ATP Tour. It was the 27th edition of the tournament and took place on outdoor clay courts at the Werzer Arena in Pörtschach am Wörthersee, Austria, from 20 May through 26 May 2007. The event was won by Juan Mónaco in men's singles and Simon Aspelin and Julian Knowle in men's doubles.

Finals

Singles

 Juan Mónaco defeated  Gaël Monfils, 7–6(7–3), 6–0

Doubles

 Simon Aspelin /  Julian Knowle defeated  Leoš Friedl /  David Škoch, 7–6(8–6), 5–7, [10–5]

References

External links
 ITF tournament edition details